Beit Mery (also Beit Mer, Beir Meri) is a Lebanese town overlooking the capital Beirut.  The town has been a summer mountain resort since the times of the Phoenicians and later the Romans. The name derives from Aramaic and means "The house of my Lord". On one of the three hills of Beit Mery (Southern end of town) along the Lebanon Western mountain range are the ruins of the old Phoenician and Roman temples that were erected in the same general area in what is now known as Deir El-Qala'a (دير القلعة). At present, a Christian church and monastery sit on top of parts of the old Roman temple. Les Scouts Du Liban Groupe Sainte Marie Beit Mery is one of the biggest movement in town and it is located in College des Freres since 1969. 
Beit Mery is home to a Lebanese Red Cross First Aid Center.

Culture
The town is the site of the annual Al Bustan festival, held in the theatre of the Al Bustan Hotel. The festival was created in 1994 by Myrna Al Bustani, owner of the hotel.

Among the artists who performed at the festival, Julian Lloyd Webber (cellist), Gautier Capuçon (cellist), Gianluca Marciano (conductor), Virginia Tola (soprano), Inva Mula (soprano), Helikon Opera, Stile Antico, Evelyn Glennie (percussions), Boris Berezovsky (pianist), Khatia Buniatishvili (pianist), Alondra de la Parra (conductor), Oliver Poole (pianist), Anna Tifu (violin), Cuarteto Latinoamericano (string quartet).

Demography
The residents of Beit Mery are mainly Christian (Maronite, Greek Orthodox, Greek Catholic, Armenian Orthodox) and Druze.

Geography
Beit Mery occupies a hill, 700–750 meters above sea level, which gives the town views of the Beirut peninsula and part of Lebanon's Mediterranean coast. It has an area of 5.48 km2. Since 2000 Beit Mery started to be a suburban town and is 16 km away from Beirut.

History
The Roman rulers of Lebanon made Beit Mery their summer resort due to its high location and summer weather.

Archaeology

There are two prehistoric archaeological sites in Beit Mery where flint industries have been found by Jesuit archaeologists:

It was found by Jesuit Father Dillenseger who determined it to be an Acheulean site. The material was donated to the Saint Joseph University by the French Faculty of Medicine.

2) Beit Mery II is east of the road from Beit Mery to Deir el Qala'a on a sloping plateau facing the junction of the Nahr Meten and Nahr Jamani. It was found by M. Gautier who recovered Heavy Neolithic flint tools from the surface. V. Hankey also recovered some retouched blades from this area.

But what makes very important Beit Mery -even for tourism- are the scattered ruins of the Roman era, that lasted five centuries plus the two of the byzantine era.

Tourism
The town has ancient Roman and Byzantine ruins as well as the historic Maronite Monastery of Saint John the Baptist, (Deir el Kalaa) which was built in 1750. The town, which is only 16 km from Beirut, continues to be a summer resort in Lebanon with a landmark hotel, the Al Bustan. Pine forests surround the town. Restaurants with views of the valleys and the sea make Beit Mery a favorite summer spot.

Climate
Beit Meri has a Hot-summer mediterranean climate (Csa) with cool, wet winters and warm, dry summers.

References

External links
Beit Mery,  Localiban
Beit Mery 

Populated places in the Matn District
Maronite Christian communities in Lebanon
Eastern Orthodox Christian communities in Lebanon
Melkite Christian communities in Lebanon
Heavy Neolithic sites
Neolithic settlements
Archaeological sites in Lebanon
Society of Lebanon
Coloniae (Roman)
Tourist attractions in Lebanon